During the Holocaust in Greece, the entire, 275-person Jewish population of the island of Zakynthos was not deported after Mayor Loukas Karrer and Bishop Chrysostomos (1890–1958) refused Nazi orders to turn in a list of the members of the town's Jewish community for deportation to the death camps. Instead they secretly hid the town's 275 Jews in various rural villages and turned in a list that included only their own two names. The entire Jewish population survived the war.

Statues of the Bishop and the Mayor commemorate their heroism on the site of the town's historic synagogue, destroyed in the earthquake of 1953. In 1978, Yad Vashem, the Holocaust Martyrs' and Heroes' Remembrance Authority in Israel, honored Bishop Chrysostomos and Mayor Karrer with the title of "Righteous Among the Nations", an honor given to non-Jews who, at personal risk, saved Jews during the Holocaust. After the war, all of the Jews of Zakynthos moved either to Israel or to Athens.

Further reading

External links
 Welcoming a Latter-day de Tocqueville
 Chrysostomos (Dimitriou) of Trifylias
 Chrysostomos of Zakynthos at Yad Vashem website

History of Zakynthos
Zakynthos
1944 in Greece
The Holocaust in Greece